Corlytics Ltd. is a regulatory risk intelligence firm. The firm works with global regulators, financial institutions and their advisors to provide data and analytics to inform future risk management. Headquartered in Dublin, Corlytics also maintains offices in, London, New York City, Boston and Sydney. The company was set up in 2013 in Dublin, Ireland by CEO, John Byrne. It is a privately held company.

Corlytics uses analytics to assess the impact of regulation. Corlytics’ services included regulatory monitoring, taxonomy mapping and regulatory advisory services. In 2016, the company obtained a €1 million investment  round through the Bank of Ireland Seed and Early Stage Fund, which is managed by Kernel Capital, with co-investors Enterprise Ireland, Angel Investors and company founders.

In 2017, Kernel Capital invested in a second round, taking a €1.9m stake in Corlytics. In addition, Infinity Capital invested €750,000 in the company. This resulted in Niall Olden, managing partner of Kernel Capital, and Cyril McGuire, CEO of Infinity Capital, joining the company's board.

In 2017, Corlytics appointed Tom Kenny as Chief Financial Officer.  It also appointed Peter Oakes, David Bundi, and Thomson Reuters’, Stacey English  to its advisory board.

References 

Companies based in Dublin (city)
Financial services companies established in 2013